Sid Ahmed Rezala (May 13, 1979 – June 28, 2000) was an Algerian-born French serial killer, dubbed "The Killer of the Trains". He was suspected of killing at least three women in 1999. Arrested in Portugal in early 2000, he confessed the murders to a reporter from the Figaro Magazine. Several weeks later, he committed suicide before he could be extradited to France. He died of asphyxiation after he intentionally set fire to the mattress in his cell while his prison guards were watching football on TV.

Biography
Born in Algeria, Sid Ahmed Rezala moved with his parents, brothers and sister to the southern French port of Marseille in 1994. Within weeks of registering at a Marseille high school, he began playing truant and mixing with petty criminals and drug dealers around the Marseille St Charles Train Station, and riding on trains. In early 1995, three months before his 16th birthday, Rezala was arrested for the rape of a 14-year-old boy. On December 7, 1995, he was sentenced in juvenile court to four years imprisonment. He was released in late 1996 after 18 months in prison.

In 1998, he was sent to a young offenders institution at Luynes, near Aix-en-Provence, for pulling a knife on a French railway employee. On June 29, 1999, he was released from jail.

French police launched a massive manhunt for Sid Ahmed Rezala in December 1999 after the murder of British student Isabel Peake, who was thrown from a train, and the subsequent killing of Corinne Caillaux, a 36-year-old French mother. Having fled to the Portuguese capital via Spain, Rezala made a phone call to a girlfriend from a public call box, unaware that investigators in France had tapped her phone. On January 11, 2000, Rezala's hiding place was discovered by Portuguese police, who arrested him in Barreiro, south of Lisbon. He had been staying in Almada with friends of a Spanish acquaintance and was planning to leave within 24 hours for Spain's Canary Islands.

On June 28, 2000, Rezala, who had confessed to killing three women, killed himself by setting fire to a mattress in his cell in the psychiatric wing of the Caxias Prison Hospital near Lisbon, where he was being held awaiting extradition to France to face trial.

Victims
Rezala is suspected of murdering at least these three women:

Isabel Peake
Isabel Peake, a 20-year-old English student at Limoges university, was pushed from a train traveling to Paris in October 1999. She was on her way home to Barlaston, Staffordshire for a visit. On 13 October 1999, she boarded the train in Limoges. Her body was found the next day by a local farmer, who discovered her partially-clothed and dismembered corpse, and her baggage was found strewn along the line. Police concluded  she was pushed from the train before dawn as it travelled at about  through the disused station at Chabenet, central France, possibly after a sexual assault.

Émilie Bazin
Émilie Bazin, a 20-year-old student who was reportedly an acquaintance of Rezala's, was found strangled in a house in Amiens, northern France. On December 17, 1999, her decomposed body was discovered by police two months after her death, buried beneath a heap of coal in a cellar in Amiens. Traces of Rezala's DNA were found on her body.

Corinne Caillaux
On December 14, 1999, Corinne Caillaux, 36, was stabbed in the lavatory of a Calais to Ventimiglia overnight train. Guards found her slumped in a pool of blood in a train toilet. She had been stabbed at least 13 times, and died later from her injuries. Caillaux was the mother of two children; her 5-year-old son lay sleeping on a couchette during the attack. Inspectors found a blood-soaked baseball hat near her body. Rezala was wearing a similar cap when he was found traveling without a ticket about two hours earlier, on the journey from Calais to Ventimiglia on the Italian frontier. DNA tests were conducted on hairs found in the hat. Police had a record of Rezala's DNA taken after earlier crimes.

See also
 List of French serial killers

References

External links
 Sid Ahmed Rezala (photos/images)

1979 births
2000 suicides

French people of Algerian descent
French people convicted of murder
French people who died in prison custody
French rapists
French serial killers
People from El Biar
Male serial killers
People convicted of murder by France
Serial killers who committed suicide in prison custody
Suicides by self-immolation
Suicides in Portugal